Sir Henry Worth Thornton, KBE (November 6, 1871 – March 14, 1933) was a businessman. Thornton served as general superintendent of the Long Island Rail Road from 1911 to 1914, general manager of the Great Eastern Railway in England from 1914 to 1922, and president of the Canadian National Railways from 1922 to 1932.

Early life and education

His parents were Henry Clay Thornton and Millamenta Comegys Worth. Thornton was educated at St. Paul's School in Concord, New Hampshire,, where he met James A. McCrea, son of James McCrea who was then president of Pennsylvania Railroad. After graduating, Thornton attended the University of Pennsylvania, where played football and served as class president during his freshman year. Upon graduation in 1894, he coached the Vanderbilt football team to a 7–1 record.

Career
Also in 1894, Thornton began his career in the railroad business, entering as a draftsman of the Pennsylvania Railroad based in the Pittsburgh office. He was promoted to supervisory engineer in 1899 and District Superintendent in 1901. He was appointed as general superintendent of Cleveland, Akron and Columbus Railroad, part of the Pennsylvania Railroad system in Ohio, in 1901. In 1912 he was named general superintendent of the Long Island Rail Road.

In 1914, Thornton was made general manager of the Great Eastern Railway Company Ltd. Thornton served during World War I. As a Major General, he was appointed inspector general of Allied transportation. In 1919 he became a British subject, and King George V made him a Knight Commander of the Order of the British Empire. Thornton was also named an officer of the Order of Leopold and a Companion of the Legion of Honor of France. He received the Distinguished Service Medal from the United States.

In 1922 Thornton was named chairman of the board and president of the Canadian National Railways and tasked with modernizing and amalgamating several lines. He championed passenger comfort, introducing onboard radios and establishing of a radio network along the route (a precursor to the Canadian Broadcasting Corporation) and investing in hotels in communities served by the railway.

When the Conservative Party came to power in 1932, Thornton was forced to resign, denied a pension, and removed from the Board of Directors of a local bank. Disgraced, Thornton moved to New York City, where he died less than a year later from pneumonia and complications from surgery.

Honors
Thornton Park (across from former CN Pacific Central Station) and Thornton Street in Vancouver and hotel (Sir Henry Thornton Village at former CN Hotel Jasper Park Lodge) in Canada, are named after Thornton. He delivered commencement addresses at MIT and Syracuse and earned an honorary doctorate from his alma mater, the University of Pennsylvania. In 1992 he was inducted into the Canadian Railway Hall of Fame.

Family

Henry Worth Thornton was the son of Henry Clay Thornton, a prominent Logansport, Indiana, lawyer, and Millamenta Comegys Worth. Thornton's uncles included Cincinnati physician William Patton Thornton. He was cousin to Judge William Wheeler Thornton.

Thornton married Virginia D. Blair on June 20, 1901; they had two children: James Worth Thornton and Anna Blair Thornton (Harrison). In 1926 they divorced. He remarried shortly thereafter to Martha Watriss.

Notes

References

External links

1871 births
1933 deaths
19th-century players of American football
American football guards
British businesspeople
Canadian National Railway executives
CNR Radio
People from Logansport, Indiana
St. Paul's School (New Hampshire) alumni
Penn Quakers football players
Vanderbilt Commodores football coaches

Canadian Knights Commander of the Order of the British Empire
Knights Commander of the Order of the British Empire

Chevaliers of the Légion d'honneur
Recipients of the Distinguished Service Medal (US Army)